Aruppukottai is a legislative assembly in Virudhunagar district, which includes the city, Aruppukkottai. It is a part of the Virudhunagar Lok Sabha constituency. This is the constituency, held by popular actor-turned politician, M.G. Ramachandran, when he first became Chief Minister in 1977 assembly elections. It is one of the 234 State Legislative Assembly Constituencies in Tamil Nadu, in India.

The Chettiyar (all kinds - mostly Devanger) community is the biggest community in this constituency with around 18% population.

The population of other communities are: 15% Devendrakula Velalar, 15% all kinds of Naidus, 14% Saliyar, 10% Mutharaiyar, 8% Mukkulathor (Mostly Maravar+Agamudaiyar), 8% Reddy, 5% Nadar, 3% Konar, 3% Pillaimar and 3% Muslims.

In the 2021 MLA election, the DMK party's Reddy candidate K.K.S.S.R Ramachandran won, and beacame the minister of Revenue and Disaster Management.

History
Until 2006 election, Aruppukottai assembly constituency was part of Ramanathapuram Lok Sabha constituency. After 2006 election, it is part of Virudhunagar Lok Sabha constituency.

Madras State

Tamil Nadu

Election Results

2021

2016

2011

2006

2001

Bye-election 1997 - 1998

1996

1991

1989

1984

1980

1977

1971

1967

1962

1957

1952

References 

 

Assembly constituencies of Tamil Nadu
Virudhunagar district